Jimmy Gleason (February 17, 1898 – September 12, 1931) was an American racecar driver.  He was killed in an AAA National Championship race at Syracuse, a week after he had captured his first Championship Car victory at Altoona.

Indianapolis 500 results

References

1898 births
1931 deaths
Racing drivers from Philadelphia
Indianapolis 500 drivers
AAA Championship Car drivers
Racing drivers who died while racing
Sports deaths in New York (state)